The Mayor of Rangitikei is the head of the Rangitikei District Council in New Zealand. The role was created in 1989 with the formation of the Rangitikei District as part of the 1989 local government reforms. The current mayor since 2013 is Andy Watson from Marton.

History
The Rangitikei District was established in 1989 as part of the 1989 local government reforms.

In 2001 Bob Buchanan was elected mayor despite not having any experience as a councillor or deputy mayor beforehand. He was re-elected in 2004. Buchanan retired from his position in 2007.

Robert "Chalky" Leary was elected mayor in 2007; he had been a councillor for the Hunterville ward since 2001. Leary was elected by receiving 1,639 votes or 31.0% of the votes with a majority of 233 votes or 4.4% over Marton ward councillor Andy Watson. He was re-elected unopposed in 2010.

The 2013 Rangitikei mayoral election saw incumbent mayor Leary facing challenges from former deputy mayor Andy Watson, Fresh Future Focus candidate Maree Brannigan and Taihape ward councillor Richard Aslett. Watson was elected by obtaining 1,983 votes (41.5%) of the total votes and a majority of 486 (10.2%) defeating incumbent mayor Chalky Leary, who received 1,497 votes.

Watson also won the 2016 Rangitikei mayoral election. He was re-elected unopposed in 2019.

List of mayors of Rangitikei
The following list shows the Mayors of Rangitikei:

See also
Rangitikei District Council
2016 Rangitikei mayoral election
Mayor of Manawatu
Mayor of Wanganui

References

External links
Rangitikei District Council website section about the mayor

Rangitikei
Politics of Rangitikei